Sand Island Light may refer to:
Sand Island Light (Alabama) at the mouth of Mobile Bay
Sand Island Light (Wisconsin) in Lake Superior